The Holy Rosary Church on E. Ninth St. in Idaho Falls, Idaho was built in 1948.  It was listed on the National Register of Historic Places in 2002.

The building is an "imposing" gable-fronted building with concrete foundation and trim, red brick walls, and a wood shingle roof.  Its style includes elements of the English Gothic style of architecture.

References

Churches on the National Register of Historic Places in Idaho
Gothic Revival church buildings in Idaho
Roman Catholic churches completed in 1948
Churches in Bonneville County, Idaho
Buildings and structures in Idaho Falls, Idaho
Churches in the Roman Catholic Diocese of Boise
National Register of Historic Places in Bonneville County, Idaho
20th-century Roman Catholic church buildings in the United States